The Noronha vireo (Vireo gracilirostris) is a species of bird in the family Vireonidae. It is endemic to the island of Fernando de Noronha, Brazil. It is found in woodland, shrubland and gardens. It has been considered conspecific with the chivi vireo in the past. However, it varies from the chivi vireo in that its plumage is significantly duller and the bill longer.

References

Noronha vireo
Endemic birds of Brazil
Fernando de Noronha
Noronha vireo
Taxonomy articles created by Polbot